Karen MacNeil (born 1954) is an American author, journalist, wine educator and consultant.

Career
After moving to New York City at the age of 19 to become a writer, MacNeil published her first article, on the subject of the best artisanal butter on offer in New York, in The Village Voice. She transitioned to writing about wine as well as food in the mid-1970s, when she was commissioned by Elle magazine to write a wine article.  She became the first wine and food editor of USA Today in the early 1980s. In 1991, Peter Workman of Workman Publishing Company read a food article she had published in The New York Times Magazine section and commissioned her to write a book for the publishing house. That book, which took 8 years to write, was The Wine Bible, which was released in 2001. The second edition of The Wine Bible came out in 2015 and the third edition in 2022.<ref name="Burrell">{{cite news |author=Jackie Burrell |date=2020-10-31 |title=The Wine Bible'''s Karen MacNeil talks virtual tastings, wine glasses and WineSpeed |work=San Jose Mercury News |url=https://www.mercurynews.com/2020/10/31/the-wine-bibles-karen-macneil-talks-virtual-tastings-wine-glasses-and-winespeed/ |access-date=2021-06-02}}</ref> As of 2023, The Wine Bible had sold close to one million copies worldwide. The Wall Street Journal, The Washington Post, and The New York Times have all praised The Wine Bible as one of the best wine books. Her second book was Wine, Food & Friends (2006), and she was the host of a 13-episode PBS series titled Wine, Food and Friends with Karen MacNeil (in tandem with the book), for which she won an Emmy.

MacNeil was the creator of and is now Chairman Emerita of the Rudd Center for Professional Wine Studies at the Culinary Institute of America at Greystone in St. Helena, California.  MacNeil also produces an online wine newsletter called WineSpeed''. During the COVID-19 pandemic, she began a series of virtual wine tastings via Zoom sessions for her clients. 

MacNeil is based in Napa Valley.  MacNeil was married to Dennis Fife (1945-2016), the past proprietor of Fife Vineyards.

See also
List of wine personalities
Jancis Robinson

References

External links
 Official website of Karen MacNeil

1954 births
Living people
Wine critics
Culinary Institute of America people